Nozay is a commune in the Essonne department in Île-de-France in northern France.

Inhabitants of Nozay are known as Nozéens.

History
As the city of La Ville-du-Bois, Nozay was a part of the city of Marcoussis in the Middle Ages.

Places to see
Church Saint-Germain, built during the 12th Century
La Pierre des Templiers, built during the 13th Century

See also
Communes of the Essonne department

References

External links
 City website 

Mayors of Essonne Association 
 

Communes of Essonne